A time/memory/data tradeoff attack is a type of cryptographic attack where an attacker tries to achieve a situation similar to the space–time tradeoff but with the additional parameter of data, representing the amount of data available to the attacker. An attacker balances or reduces one or two of those parameters in favor of the other one or two. This type of attack is very difficult, so most of the ciphers and encryption schemes in use were not designed to resist it.

History 

Tradeoff attacks on symmetric cryptosystems date back to 1980, when Martin Hellman suggested a time/memory tradeoff method to break block ciphers with  possible keys in time  and memory  related by the tradeoff curve  where . Later, in 1995, Babbage and Golic devised a different tradeoff attack for stream ciphers with a new bound such that  for  where  is the output data available to the cryptanalyst at real time.

Attack mechanics 

This attack is a special version of the general cryptanalytic time/memory tradeoff attack, which has two main phases: 
 Preprocessing:  During this phase, the attacker explores the structure of the cryptosystem and is allowed to record their findings in large tables. This can take a long time.
 Realtime:  In this phase, the cryptanalyst is granted real data obtained from a specific unknown key. They then try to use this data with the precomputed table from the preprocessing phase to find the particular key in as little time as possible.

Any time/memory/data tradeoff attack has the following parameters: 
 search space size
 time required for the preprocessing phase
 time required for the realtime phase
 amount of memory available to the attacker
 amount of realtime data available to the attacker

Hellman's attack on block ciphers 

For block ciphers, let  be the total number of possible keys and also assume the number of possible plaintexts and ciphertexts to be . Also let the given data be a single ciphertext block of a specific plaintext counterpart. If we consider the mapping from the key  to the ciphertext  as a random permutation function  over an  point space, and if this function  is invertible; we need to find the inverse of this function . 
Hellman's technique to invert this function:
During the preprocessing stage
The start points are the leftmost column in the matrix and the end points are the rightmost column. Then store the pairs of start and end points in increasing order of end points values.

Now, only one matrix will not be able to cover the whole  space. But if we add more rows to the matrix, we will end up with a huge matrix that includes recovered points more than once. Consider the first  paths from start points to end points are all disjoint with  points, such that the next path which has at least one common point with one of those previous paths and includes exactly  points. We achieve this by enforcing the matrix stopping rule: .
Nevertheless, an  matrix with  covers a portion  of the whole space. Also  since we only need to store the pairs of start and end points and we have  matrices each of  pairs.

During the real time phase

According to Hellman, if the block cipher at hand has the property that the mapping from its key to cipher text is a random permutation function  over an  point space, and if this  is invertible, the tradeoff relationship becomes much better: .

Babbage-and-Golic attack on stream ciphers 

For stream ciphers,  is specified by the number of internal states of the bit generatorprobably different from the number of keys.  is the count of the first pseudorandom bits produced from the generator. Finally, the attacker's goal is to find one of the actual internal states of the bit generator to be able to run the generator from this point on to generate the rest of the key. Associate each of the possible  internal states of the bit generator with the corresponding string that consists of the first  bits obtained by running the generator from that state by the mapping  from states  to output prefixes . This previous mapping is considered a random function over the  points common space. To invert this function, an attacker establishes the following. 
During the preprocessing phase, pick  random  states and compute their corresponding  output prefixes. 
During the realtime phase, you have  generated bits.
Search for each  in the generated table which takes log time. 
If you have a hit, this  corresponds to an internal state  of the bit generator from which you can forward run the generator to obtain the rest of the key.
This result from the Birthday attack gives the condition  with attack time  and preprocessing time  which is just a particular point on the tradeoff curve .

Shamir and Biryukov's attack on stream ciphers 

This novel idea introduced in 2000 combines the Hellman and Babbage-and-Golic tradeoff attacks to achieve a new tradeoff curve with better bounds for stream cipher cryptoanalysis. Hellman's block cipher technique can be applied to a stream cipher by using the same idea of covering the  points space through matrices obtained from multiple variants  of the function  which is the mapping of internal states to output prefixes. Recall that this tradeoff attack on stream cipher is successful if any of the given  output prefixes is found in any of the matrices covering .

Attacks on stream ciphers with low sampling resistance 

This attack, invented by Biryukov, Shamir, and Wagner, relies on a specific feature of some stream ciphers: that the bit generator undergoes only few changes in its internal state before producing the next output bit.
But when forcing large number of output bits to take specific values, this enumeration process become very expensive and difficult.
Now, we can define the sampling resistance of a stream cipher to be  with  the maximum value which makes such enumeration feasible.

Let the stream cipher be of  states each has a full name of  bits and a corresponding output name which is the first  bits in the output sequence of bits. If this stream cipher has sampling resistance , then an efficient enumeration can use a short name of  bits to define the special states of the generator. Each special state with  short name has a corresponding short output name of  bits which is the output sequence of the special state after removing the first  leading bits. Now, we are able to define a new mapping over a reduced space of  points and this mapping is equivalent to the original mapping. If we let , the realtime data available to the attacker is guaranteed to have at least one output of those special states. Otherwise, we relax the definition of special states to include more points.

References 

Cryptographic attacks